Dobrovítov is a municipality and village in Kutná Hora District in the Central Bohemian Region of the Czech Republic. It has about 100 inhabitants.

Administrative parts
The village of Dědice is an administrative part of Dobrovítov.

Geography
It lies in the Upper Sázava Hills. The Klejnárka River flows through the municipality.

History
The first written mention of Dobrovítov is from 1355.

References

Villages in Kutná Hora District